Emir Ujkani (born 17 August 1985 in Resnik, Vushtrri) is a Kosovar retired football goalkeeper.

Club career

Early life
Ujkani was born in Resnik, a village near Vushtrri, SFR Yugoslavia, before moving to Belgium along with his family in November 1994.

In 2011, Ujkani moved to Italy to play for Brindisi.

Personal life
He is the older brother of former Albania international Samir Ujkani. In 2015, Emir was arrested for attempted manslaughter in Brussels.

References

1985 births
Living people
Sportspeople from Vushtrri
Kosovo Albanians
Kosovan emigrants to Belgium
Belgian people of Albanian descent
Association football defenders
Kosovan footballers
Belgian footballers
K.V. Kortrijk players
KF Bylis Ballsh players
S.S.D. Città di Brindisi players
Sportkring Sint-Niklaas players
Kosovan expatriate footballers
Expatriate footballers in Belgium
Kosovan expatriate sportspeople in Belgium
Expatriate footballers in Albania
Kosovan expatriate sportspeople in Albania
Expatriate footballers in Italy
Kosovan expatriate sportspeople in Italy